Laine Hardy (born September 12, 2000) is an American singer from Livingston, Louisiana, and the season 17 winner of American Idol.

Early life
Hardy was born in Baton Rouge, Louisiana, and raised in Livingston, Louisiana. His father Barry is a general contractor for a construction company, and his mother Cindy Lou is a real estate agent. He has a brother Kyle, and an older sister, Brittany Banta. His maternal grandmother is a Korean immigrant from Seoul. He attended French Settlement High School and graduated in 2018. He learned to play the guitar when he was eight, and by the time he was 14, he was performing in a band with his brother and cousins called the Band Hardy in local bars and restaurants. Although initially he did not sing, he was encouraged by his brother to sing.

American Idol
Laine Hardy first auditioned for the 2018 season 16 of American Idol, but did not go far in that season, making it only to the top 50. He did not intend to audition for the 2019 season 17, but accompanied his friend Ashton Gill to play guitar at her audition, and was encouraged by judges Katy Perry, Luke Bryan and Lionel Richie to audition again. This time he made it all the way to the final and won the competition, making Alejandro Aranda runner-up and Madison VanDenburg second runner-up.

Performance results

Music career

Hardy released a three-song EP, In the Bayou, in 2018. Later that year he released the song "Blue Christmas". Following his win on American Idol, his coronation song "Flame" was released on May 19, 2019. He performed the single on The View in May 2019. On September 20, 2019, Hardy announced his first headline tour, a 13-date tour taking place from November 14 through December 7, 2019, across the US. He released two new songs, "Ground I Grew Up On" and "Let There Be Country", in April 2020, and performed a cover of "Life Is A Highway" on American Idol in May 2020.

His single "Tiny Town" was released in July 2020, following his recovery from COVID-19. A holiday single, a cover of "Please Come Home For Christmas" followed in September. While "Tiny Town" was sent to radio, Hardy released another single "Other LA" to streaming services.

Following a couple televised performances (including the 2020 National Tree Lighting Ceremony), Hardy released a new single "Memorize You" in May 2021. The song garnered positive reviews and gained popularity after his performance on ABC's The Bachelor series. A follow-up single "Authentic" was released in July, leading to the announcement of his debut album Here's To Anyone a few weeks later. The album was released on September 17.

2022 arrest
On April 29, 2022, Hardy was arrested by the Louisiana State University Police Department and booked into the East Baton Rouge Parish Prison based on allegations that he planted a recording device in the Louisiana State University dormitory room occupied by a woman who described him as her ex-boyfriend. The arrest warrant alleged that the device was found in a futon by the woman and her roommate, and that the woman became suspicious when he told her information about her private life that she had never disclosed to him. The warrant also alleged that Hardy, who was not an LSU student, had confessed to the woman that he bugged the room while falsely claiming that he threw the device into a pond. It was later reported that Hardy was cooperating with investigators following his arrest.

Discography

Albums

Extended plays

Singles

References

External links
 

2000 births
Living people
American Idol winners
The Voice (franchise) contestants
Musicians from Baton Rouge, Louisiana
Singers from Louisiana
21st-century American singers
Hollywood Records artists
21st-century American male singers
American musicians of Korean descent